WTQS (1490 AM) is a radio station licensed to Cameron, South Carolina, United States, serving the Orangeburg-Calhoun area. The station is currently owned by Peter Schiff, through licensee Community Broadcasters, LLC, and is a simulcast of WFRK in Florence.

On May 11, 2015 WTQS was granted a Federal Communications Commission construction permit to move to 1500 kHz, construct a new taller and much more efficient antenna, downgrade from Class C to Class D, increase day power to 5,000 watts, decrease critical hours power from 1,000 watts to 730 watts and discontinue operation at night.  The FM station is a 24-7 station.

Programming is conservative talk radio, with notable programs outside WFRK's morning show including Glenn Beck, The O'Reilly Report, Dan Bongino, Sean Hannity, Mark Levin, and Brian Kilmeade.

References

External links

TQS
Calhoun County, South Carolina
Radio stations established in 2008
2008 establishments in South Carolina